Way Kuo (born 5 January 1951 in Taipei, Taiwan) is the current President and University Distinguished Professor of the City University of Hong Kong. Before joining CityU, he was University Distinguished Professor and Dean of Engineering at the University of Tennessee.

Kuo received his PhD degree in engineering in 1980 from Kansas State University and BS degree in nuclear engineering in 1972 from National Tsing-Hua University in Taiwan.

Kuo is a Foreign Member of the Chinese Academy of Engineering. He was elected a member of the US National Academy of Engineering in 2000 for contributions to reliability design for microelectronics products and systems. He is also a member of Academia Sinica in Taiwan and International Academy for Quality. He is Fellow of the American Society for Quality (ASQ), Institute of Electrical and Electronics Engineers (IEEE), Institute for Operations Research and the Management Sciences (INFORMS), American Statistical Association (ASA), and Institute of Industrial Engineers (IIE).

References

1951 births
Living people
Fellow Members of the IEEE
Fellows of the American Statistical Association
Fellows of the Institute for Operations Research and the Management Sciences
Members of Academia Sinica
Members of the United States National Academy of Engineering
Foreign members of the Chinese Academy of Engineering
Kansas State University alumni
National Tsing Hua University alumni
Scientists from Taipei
Heads of universities in Hong Kong
Taiwanese nuclear engineers
Academic staff of the City University of Hong Kong
American expatriates in Hong Kong
 Taiwanese expatriates in Hong Kong